René Wheeler (8 February 1912 - 11 December 2000) was a French screenwriter and film director. He co-wrote the story of the film A Cage of Nightingales (1945) with Georges Chaperot, for which they both received an Academy Award nomination in 1947. Their story would later serve as an inspiration for the hugely successful film The Chorus (2004). Wheeler also co-wrote the screenplay for the 1955 heist film Rififi.

Selected filmography
 Moutonnet (1936)
 Night Warning (1946)
 The Faceless Enemy (1946)
 The Winner's Circle (1950)
 The Love of a Woman (1953)
 Double or Quits (1953)
 Rififi (1955)
 The Restless and the Damned (1959)
 A Woman in White (1965)

References

External links

French male screenwriters
20th-century French screenwriters
French film directors
1912 births
2000 deaths
20th-century French male writers